This is a list of ports of entry in South Africa.

Airports

Airports with regular scheduled international flights
 Cape Town International Airport (Cape Town)
 King Shaka International Airport (Durban)
 Kruger Mpumalanga International Airport (Mbombela)
 OR Tambo International Airport (Johannesburg)

Other airports with customs/immigration facilities
 Bram Fischer International Airport (Bloemfontein)
 Lanseria Airport
 Pilanesberg International Airport
 Polokwane International Airport (a.k.a. Gateway International)
 Chief Dawid Stuurman International Airport
 Upington Airport

  South African Department of Home Affairs - South African Ports of Entry

Sea ports

East coast

 Port of Durban
 Port of East London
 Port of Mossel Bay
 Port of Port Elizabeth
 Port of Ngqura
 Port of Richards Bay

West coast

 Port of Cape Town
 Port of Saldanha Bay

Land ports

Botswana border

 Bray
 Derdepoort
 Groblersbrug
 Kopfontein
 Makopong
 Makgobbistad
 McCarthy's Rest
 Middlepits a.k.a. Middelputs
 Makopong
 Platjan
 Pontdrif
 Ramatlabama
 Skilpadshek
 Stockpoort
 Swartkopfontein
 Tweerivieren
 Zanzibar

Eswatini border (Swaziland)

 Bothashoop
 Emahlathini
 Golela
 Jeppe's Reef
 Josefsdal
 Mahamba
 Mananga 
 Nerston
 Onverwacht, KZN
 Oshoek
 Waverley

Lesotho border

 Boesmansnek
 Caledonspoort
 Ficksburg Bridge
 Makhaleng Bridge
 Maseru 
 Monantsa Pass
 Ongeluksnek
 Peka Bridge
 Qacha's Nek
 Ramatsilitso
 Sani Pass
 Sepapu's Gate
 Tele Bridge
 Van Rooyen's Gate

Mozambique border

 Giriyondo
 Kosi Bay
 Lebombo
 Pafuri

Namibia border

 Alexander Bay, Northern Cape
 Gemsbok
 Nakop
 Onseepkans
 Rietfontein
 Sendelingsdrif
 Vioolsdrif

Zimbabwe border

 Beit Bridge

References

[1] South African Department of Home Affairs - South African Ports of Entry

 
 Ports of entry